The 2nd Vermont Infantry Regiment was a three years' infantry regiment in the Union Army during the American Civil War. It served in the eastern theater, predominantly in the VI Corps, Army of the Potomac, from June 1861 to July 1865. It was a member of the famous Vermont Brigade.

History

In July 1861, the United States Congress authorized President Abraham Lincoln to call out 500,000 men, to serve for three years unless sooner discharged. The 2nd Vermont Infantry was the first of the three years regiments from the state placed in the field as a result of this call, and it served longer in the service than all but one other Vermont unit, the 7th Vermont Infantry. It was organized from militia companies from Brattleboro, Burlington, Castleton, Fletcher, Ludlow, Montpelier, Tunbridge, Vergennes and Waterbury.

The colonelcy of the regiment was initially offered to Israel B. Richardson, a native of Vermont, but he had just accepted command of the 1st Michigan Infantry. Richardson recommended a classmate from the United States Military Academy, Henry H. Whiting, and he was commissioned by Governor Erastus Fairbanks on June 6, 1861. George J. Stannard, of St. Albans, was appointed lieutenant colonel, and Charles H. Joyce, a young lawyer from Northfield, was appointed major.

The regiment rendezvoused at Burlington, and was mustered into United States service on June 20. Four days later, the regiment left for Washington, D.C., arriving on June 26. It was initially brigaded with three Maine regiments under command of Colonel Oliver O. Howard. On July 21, the brigade participated in the First Battle of Bull Run. The regiment suffered 68 casualties: 2 killed, 35 wounded and 31 missing.

August 12, 1861, the regiment transferred to Chain Bridge, where it went into camp with the 3rd Vermont Infantry, 6th Maine Infantry and 33rd New York Infantry. In September, the 4th, 5th and 6th Vermont regiments joined with the 2nd and 3rd to form the famous "Old Vermont Brigade," under the command of newly promoted Brigadier General William Farrar Smith, previously commander of the 3rd Vermont Infantry. Smith was soon assigned command of the division of which the Vermont Brigade was a part, and William T. H. Brooks, a native of Ohio, but the son of a Vermonter, assumed command.

The history of the regiment from this point on is essentially that of the Vermont Brigade, except for numerous personnel changes.

Colonel Whiting resigned on February 9, 1863, and was replaced by James H. Walbridge, who commanded the regiment until he resigned on April 1, 1864. He was replaced by Newton Stone, who was killed in action at the Battle of the Wilderness, on May 5, 1864. His replacement, John S. Tyler, had been wounded on May 5, and died of his wounds on May 23. Amasa Tracy, his replacement, commanded the regiment until it was disbanded.

Lieutenant Colonel George J. Stannard was promoted to the colonelcy of the 9th Vermont Infantry on May 21, 1862, and later commanded the 2nd Vermont Brigade, which garnered honors for its participation in the repulse of Pickett's Charge at the Battle of Gettysburg on July 3, 1863.

The original members of the regiment, who did not reenlist, were mustered out of the service on June 29, 1864. One year recruits and others whose term of service was due to expire prior to October 1, 1865, were mustered out on June 19, 1865. The remaining officers and men mustered out of service on July 15.

Medal of Honor

Five members of the regiment were awarded the Medal of Honor.
 Captain Dayton P. Clarke, Company F, was credited with "distinguished conduct in a desperate hand-to-hand fight while commanding the regiment," at the Battle of Spotsylvania, on May 12, 1864.
 Sergeant Ephraim W. Harrington, Company G, "carried the colors to the top of the heights and almost to the muzzle of the enemy's guns," at the Second Battle of Fredericksburg, on May 3, 1863.
 Private William W. Noyes, Company F, "standing upon the top of the breastworks, [he] deliberately took aim and fired no less than 15 shots into the enemy's lines, but a few yards away," at Spotsylvania, on May 12, 1864.
 2nd Lieutenant Augustus J. Robbins, Company B, "while voluntarily serving as a staff officer successfully withdrew a regiment across and around a severely exposed position to the rest of the command; was severely wounded," at Spotsylvania, on May 12, 1864.
 Lieutenant Colonel Amasa S. Tracy, serving with Lieutenant H. E. Farrel "took command of and led the brigade in the assault on the enemy's works," at the Battle of Cedar Creek, on October 19, 1864.

Engagements

Final Statement

See also
 Vermont Brigade
 Vermont in the Civil War
 George J. Stannard

Notes

References

External links
 Vermont in the Civil War
 Vermont National Guard Library and Museum
 Vermont Military Records Project, Vermont Public Records Division

Units and formations of the Union Army from Vermont
Vermont Brigade
1861 establishments in Vermont
Vermont in the American Civil War